Norma Jean Izard, OBE (née Preston; Born ) is a former English cricketer. She is the longest-serving manager, managing the England women's cricket team from 1984, in 12 international tours before stepping down in 1993.

Early life 
Izard was born in Beckenham, the only child of William and Olive Preston. Her father was a cricketer for Cornwall. She was educated at Beckenham Grammar School, and then attended Dartford College of Physical Education (now part of University of Greenwich).

Career 
At seventeen Izard played for Kent, and the club, Kent Nomads. She then became a teacher of physical education. She was the manager of  England women's cricket team between 1984 and 1993. Izard is the longest-serving senior England cricket manager, managing 12 international tours before stepping down, after England won the 1993 World Cup.

Izard was one of the first ten women admitted to the MCC in 1999, as an honorary life member. She served as the last ever president of the Women's Cricket Association (WCA) from 1994 to 1998, overseeing the eventual merger with the English Cricket Board (ECB).

Charity 
Izard is a member of the Lady Taverners charity and a trustee of Chance to Shine.

Honours and awards
She was appointed an Officer of the Order of the British Empire (OBE) for services to women's cricket in the Queen's 1995 Birthday Honours.

References

1933 births
Living people
Cricket managers
Cricketers from Beckenham
English women cricketers
Officers of the Order of the British Empire